Tchorek plaques are a common design of memorial plaque in Warsaw, Poland, used to commemorate places where battles or executions took place during the German occupation of the city during World War II. They are based on an original design by sculptor Karol Tchorek from 1949.

These plaques were installed at various locations in Warsaw from the 1950s until the end of the communist era in Poland, and are one of the most characteristic elements of the landscape of the capital. Many of the original plaques no longer exist, having been removed or destroyed during the ongoing modernisation and expansion of the city and its transport network. However, in 2013 there were still more than 160 Tchorek plaques within the administrative borders of Warsaw.

History 
Warsaw was almost completely destroyed during World War II, and after the Warsaw Uprising of 1944 the entire population of the city was expelled by the Germans. After the Soviet army entered Warsaw in January 1945, following the departure of the Germans, inhabitants returning to the ruined city began to spontaneously commemorate places where battles or executions had taken place during the period of German occupation and the Warsaw Uprising, with crosses and makeshift memorials.

After some time, the authorities of the nascent People's Republic of Poland decided to give these memorials a more formal and organised character. This task was entrusted to the Council for the Protection of Struggle and Martyrdom Sites, established by the city of Warsaw. In the second half of the 1940s the committee decided to use memorial plaques made to a uniform design, which initially consisted of black metal plates adorned with white crosses and a brief description of the events that had taken place at the location.

In 1948, a nationwide competition was announced to create a formal design of memorial plaque to commemorate Polish struggle and martyrdom under German occupation. A year later the first prize was awarded to Warsaw sculptor Karol Tchorek who designed a type of array-relief, forged in grey sandstone, with a Maltese cross in the middle. Starting from the 1950s, "Tchorek plaques" were used to commemorate martyrdom sites in Warsaw and the surrounding suburban towns (including Marki and Opacz Kolonia). Tchorek's design continued to be used until the end of the communist era, and even as late as 1994. According to Ella Chmielewska, the plaques have merged into the landscape of the city to the extent that they are often treated not as works of art, but as a specific element of the urban information system.

In 1962, the Citizens Committee for the Protection of Monuments of Struggle and Martyrdom decided that young people would be entrusted with looking after individual plaques, and most still have their own patrons today. This function is generally performed by schools, public institutions, enterprises, community organisations and professional associations.

Tchorek originally intended the plaques to have a central inscription which read: "This place is sanctified by the blood of martyrdom of Poles fighting for freedom" but this was changed during the implementation of the project to: "This place is sanctified by the blood of Poles fighting for the freedom of their homeland." His proposals for the text describing the commemorated events on individual plaques were also repeatedly modified without his knowledge and consent. This state of affairs became a cause of persistent conflict between Tchorek and the communist bureaucracy. In 1968 a dispute with the Laboratory of Visual Arts over the copyright and remuneration for the lettering of 51 plaques and 35 monoliths was settled in his favour.

The wording of the text was always heavily influenced by political pressure. Most of the plaques commemorate German atrocities that took place during the Warsaw Uprising, an event that the communist authorities of the People's Republic of Poland found highly controversial, as it was organised by the Polish resistance movement which had fought for Poland's independence during World War 2 - principally the Home Army, the remnants of which were brutally suppressed by the post-war Stalinist regime. The significance of the uprising was downplayed for many years after the Second World War, while the Home Army and wartime Polish government were condemned by communist propaganda. These political factors made official memorialisation of the Warsaw Uprising impossible for decades after the war.

For this reason the inscriptions on Tchorek plaques had to be carefully worded to comply with official censorship, principally to avoid any direct reference to the Warsaw Uprising or the Home Army, although they sometimes contain indirect references - for example, in some cases the text mentions "insurgents" or that the commemorated event took place in an "insurgent hospital".

Another linguistic convention used in the inscriptions is that the Germans are always referred to as "Hitlerowcy" (Hitlerites).

The exact number of Tchorek plaques that were created is not known. At the end of 1983 there were still approximately 200 in existence. In his 1987 registry, Stanislaw Ciepłowski evaluated their number at about 180. In this article we describe 165 plaques located within the administrative boundaries of the city of Warsaw.

Appearance 
Tchorek plaques are made of sandstone and are either displayed on the walls of buildings or exist as free-standing monoliths. In some cases plaques were added to preserved fragments of buildings that were destroyed during the war. There is often a small metal sign next to the plaque which indicates who is the patron of the memorial.

The central motif of the original design is the Maltese Cross. The shield in the middle of the cross is usually adorned with the inscription: "MIEJSCE UŚWIĘCONE KRWIĄ POLAKÓW POLEGŁYCH ZA WOLNOŚĆ OJCZYZNY" ("a place sanctified by the blood of Poles fallen for the freedom of the fatherland"), although there are minor variations.

Under the Maltese cross symbol there is a short inscription containing basic information about the event that is being commemorated. These inscriptions sometimes contain grammatical, spelling and punctuation errors (a result of the rush accompanying their creation). There are also occasional factual errors - for example, an incorrect date or an inaccurate number of victims. In several cases, Tchorek plaques commemorate events about which there is no mention in historical sources. In 2009, the city of Warsaw appointed a team that made an inventory of the plaques still in existence - however, no attempt was made to correct errors in the inscriptions.

A slightly different form of plaque was used to commemorate Holocaust victims, or the martyrdom of Soviet prisoners of war. Such plaques are distinguished by the lack of the Maltese cross symbol and a shorter central inscription: "CZEŚĆ ICH PAMIĘCI" ("honour to their memory").

Some Tchorek plaques are now in poor condition. Since the end of communist rule in Poland many new memorials have been created in Warsaw (which have no uniform design) and in many cases they directly supersede the original Tchorek plaques.

Locations 
Below is a list of existing Tchorek plaques - sorted by district, then by street name. Note that the English translations of the inscriptions are not entirely accurate as they were created with the help of machine translation. The original Polish inscriptions are on the corresponding Polish Wikipedia page.

Bielany

Mokotów

Ochota

Praga Południe

Praga Północ

Rembertów

Śródmieście

Targówek

Ursynów

Wawer

Wesoła

Wilanów

Włochy

Wola

Żoliborz

Examples of lost Tchorek plaques 

 137 Czerniakowska Street (monastery of the Sisters of Nazareth) – the plaque commemorated the fierce battles fought in the area during the Warsaw Uprising. On 27–28 August 1944, soldiers of the AK "Baszta” (Tower) regiment mastered the strong point of resistance in the monastery complex of the Sisters of Nazareth, which was one of the elements of the German barrier separating downtown from the insurgent Mokotów. In 1996 the plaque was replaced by a new type of Tchorek plaque which described more specifically the commemorated events and the role played in them by the AK "Baszta”.
 Kopińska Street (next to the tunnel by the West Railway Station (Warszawa Zachodnia)) – the plaque commemorated the victims of the street execution conducted in the period when SS-Brigadeführer Franz Kutschera occupied a post of SS and Police Leader of the Warsaw District. On 17 November 1943, several dozen of Pawiak prison inmates were executed in this place. The plaque was accidentally destroyed during the reconstruction of the track. Currently, victims of execution are commemorated by a new type of plaque, set on Jerozolimskie Avenue near the West Railway Station.
 Krakowska Avenue, at the corner with Materii Street – a plaque commemorated the AK soldiers killed in the second day of the Warsaw Uprising. On August 2, 1944, the Germans surrounded, and then set fire to the house at 175 Krakowska Avenue. In the flames or by German bullets, 50 soldiers and several nurses were killed. In 1992 the plaque was replaced with a cross.

Notes

References 
 
 
 
 
 
 
 
 
 
 
 
 
 
 
 
 
 
 
 
 

Monuments and memorials in Warsaw
Commemoration of Nazi crimes